Cymindis larissae is a species of ground beetle in the subfamily Harpalinae. It was described by Sundukov in 1999.

References

larissae
Beetles described in 1999